The 1963 Copa del Generalísimo Juvenil was the 13th staging of the tournament. The competition began on May 12, 1963, and ended on June 23, 1963, with the final.

First round

|}

Quarterfinals

|}

Semifinals

|}

Final

Copa del Rey Juvenil de Fútbol
Juvenil